François-Xavier Ross (born 1869 in Grosses-Roches) was a Canadian clergyman and prelate for the Roman Catholic Diocese of Gaspé. He was appointed bishop in 1922. He died in 1945.

References 

1869 births
1945 deaths
Canadian Roman Catholic bishops